The following lists events that happened in 1910 in El Salvador.

Incumbents
President: Fernando Figueroa
Vice President: Manuel Enrique Araujo

Events

Births
 14 December – Óscar Osorio, politician (d. 1969)

Deaths

 27 April – Ángel Guirola, politician (b. 1826)

References

 
El Salvador
1910s in El Salvador
Years of the 20th century in El Salvador
El Salvador